Steven "Pearl" Renouf (born 8 June 1970) is an Australian former professional rugby league footballer who played in the 1980s, 1990s and 2000s. He was known as one of the sport's greatest s. Renouf set numerous records for the Brisbane Broncos club. After spending eleven years with Brisbane, which yielded four premierships, he left Australia to play for English club Wigan Warriors, where he spent two seasons before retiring. He was named in Australia's Indigenous team of the century (1908–2007).

Playing career

Brisbane Broncos
Of Aboriginal and European descent, Renouf was born in Murgon, Queensland on 8 June 1970. A Murgon Mustangs junior, he developed his game with the Brisbane Broncos in his teen years. Renouf made his first grade NSWRL Premiership début in the 1989 Brisbane Broncos season. He scored his first try for the club in 1990, and the following year went on to set a new club record of four tries in a home fixture, and be the Broncos' top try scorer of the 1991 Brisbane Broncos season and 1992 (along with Allan Langer) seasons. In 1992, the Broncos claimed their first premiership, winning the Winfield Cup Grand Final against St. George 28–8, which was highlighted by a 98-metre try to Renouf in the second half. After Willie Carne had somehow managed to avoid being trapped in his in-goal, Broncos captain Allan Langer passed to Renouf who stepped inside Rex Terp and took off downfield with Michael Hancock in support no one in front of him after burning Saints fullback Michael Potter for speed. Veteran Dragons winger Ricky Walford gave chase and made ground on him as Renouf tired over the final 20 metres, but failed to stop him from scoring.

In the weeks following the Broncos Grand Final win, Renouf travelled with the Kangaroos to England for the 1992 World Cup Final at the famous Wembley Stadium. Renouf made his début for Australia in front of an international rugby league record attendance of 73,631 fans, scoring the only try of the match after running off a pass from Broncos teammate Kevin Walters in the second half. Australia defeated Great Britain 10–6 to win their sixth Rugby League World Cup. A week later, Renouf played for Brisbane in the 1992 World Club Challenge against 1991–92 British champions Wigan at Central Park in Wigan. The Broncos capped their best year by defeating Wigan 22–8 and becoming the first Australian team to win the World Club Challenge in England.

In 1997, Renouf scored 14 tries, which included a hat-trick against the Cronulla-Sutherland Sharks in the 1997 Super League grand final on 20 September at ANZ Stadium in Brisbane's 26–8 victory. He was therefore named man-of-the-match. No other player would score 3 tries in a Grand Final until Manly winger Michael Robertson did so in 2008.

He played centre for the Brisbane Broncos in their win at the 1998 NRL grand final. Over a decade after leaving the Broncos he was still the club's all-time leading try scorer, having amassed a total of 142 tries.

Wigan Warriors
Renouf's Wigan Warriors début came in round four of the Challenge Cup against Whitehaven at Central Park. he scored two tries on début in his side's mammoth 98–4 victory.

In 2000, Renouf was awarded the Australian Sports Medal for his contribution to Australia's international standing in rugby league. Renouf played for the Wigan Warriors at centre their 2000 Super League Grand Final loss against St Helens R.F.C. His final game for the Wigan Warriors and indeed his last game at the highest level was the 2001 Super League Grand Final on 13 October at Old Trafford in Manchester. His side lost to the Bradford Bulls by 37–6.

Upon his time at Wigan Warriors, Renouf quoted "The two years at Wigan were absolutely brilliant. I would have liked to stay but they didn’t want to retain me"

Back in Australia
Following his return to Australia he continued playing football for Easts in the Queensland Cup alongside former Broncos teammate Darren Smith.
In 2006 Renouf became the 7th former player inducted into the Broncos official Hall of Fame.
During the 2007 season at the Broncos' 20-year anniversary celebration, the club announced a list of the 20 best players to play for them to date which included Renouf.

In August 2008, Renouf was named at centre in the Indigenous Team of the Century.

Career stats

Club

Representative

Personal life
At the age of 23, six years after signing with the Brisbane Broncos, Renouf was diagnosed with type 1 diabetes. Renouf remembers that he "had been losing weight quite rapidly, [and] was always going to the toilet and though it was the start of pre-season, [he] had no energy, [he] couldn’t lift anything in the gym". He decided to go to the doctor and found out that he had the disease. According to Renouf "diabetes is not all doom and gloom, you can live with it." His advice to young people who have diabetes is "Never think that it can stop you from achieving your goals. Just look after it, and you can achieve anything. I looked after it...I knew I had to if I wanted to keep playing football."

Renouf has an apprenticeship as an electrician and has also worked in the industry of sales and marketing. He has five children – four sons and one daughter. He is currently working for the Institute for Urban Indigenous Health, as an Ambassador for the Deadly Choices preventative health program.

Since retirement, Renouf has worked as a sideline commentator for Triple M's Blood, Sweat and Beers sports show.

In February 2006, a biography of Renouf was released.  Entitled The Pearl: Steve Renouf's Story, the book details his career as a professional rugby league footballer, but it also covers his early life, including his family heritage and his childhood in the Queensland town of Murgon. It also discusses how, as an Aborigine, he had to overcome prejudices from people around him.

Sources

External links 

Steve Renouf at wiganwarriors.com
 Steve Renouf Wigan Career Page on the Wigan RL Fansite.

1970 births
Rugby league players from Queensland
Indigenous Australian rugby league players
Australia national rugby league team players
Brisbane Broncos players
Wigan Warriors players
Queensland Rugby League State of Origin players
Eastern Suburbs Tigers players
Rugby league centres
Recipients of the Australian Sports Medal
Living people